Evolution is the ninth studio album by Hed PE released through Pavement Music. This marks the last appearance of Mawk and Jaxon.

Track listing

Personnel

(Hed) Planet Earth
Jahred (Jared Gomes) - vocals
Jaxon (Jaxon Benge) - guitars
Mawk (Mark Young) - bass
Trauma (Jeremiah Stratton) - drums

Production
Jahred Gomes - production, engineering
Ulrich Wild - mixing
Maor Appelbaum - mastering

References

2014 albums
Hed PE albums
Hardcore punk albums by American artists